The Secret is a 2016 Chinese suspense romance film directed by Wong Chun-chun. It was released in China on January 15, 2016.

Plot

The scene starts with Kai-Feng watching television at night. There is a documentary about bringing the dead back to life as a ghost, with one important thing to be remembered: the ghost cannot be self-aware of their status as a ghost.

Cast
Leon Lai as Kai-feng
Wang Luodan as Qiu-jie
JJ Lin as Jimmy
Sandrine Pinna as Yanzi
Shek Sau
Patrick J Molloy as Willie Robinson
Nick Murphy as Checkpoint Soldier

Reception
The film grossed  in China.

References

External links

2016 romance films
Chinese suspense films
Chinese romance films
Films directed by Wong Chun-chun